Steve Jarratt is a long-time videogames journalist and magazine editor. He has launched a large number of magazines for Future Publishing, many of which are still published. Magazines he has worked for include:
Zzap!64: Reviewer and assistant editor (March 1987 – May 1988)
CRASH: Editor (April–July 1988)
CU Amiga: Reviewer (approx. late 1988)
Amiga Format: Writer and reviewer (August 1989– ?), editor (June 1994 – Jan 1995)
 S: The Sega Magazine: Launch editor (December 1989–?)
Commodore Format: Launch editor (October 1990 – early 1992)
Total!: Launch editor (January 1992 - late 1993)
Edge: Launch editor (1993–?)
Official UK PlayStation Magazine
T3: Launch editor (1997–?)
Laptop Magazine: Launch editor (September-November(?) 2003)
3D World
Official Nintendo Magazine: Group Senior Editor 12 February 2006 (2006–?)
Windows Vista: The Official Magazine: Editor-in-chief (2007)

As Group Senior Editor at Future Publishing he oversaw existing titles like SFX, Practical Classics, 3D World and Official Xbox Magazine. He won the Games Media Legend award at the 2008 Games Media Awards but left Future Publishing in 2011. He went on to work for a small digital publisher in Bristol.

References

External links
"Zzap! Where are they now?." Accessed 6 March 2006

British male journalists
British magazine editors
Year of birth missing (living people)
Living people
Video game critics
British critics